Alexis Hoag-Fordjour (born 1982) is an assistant professor of law and co-director of the Center for Criminal Justice at Brooklyn Law School.  Born in Southern California, Hoag-Fordjour is a first-generation Tanzanian-American (Chagga). She received a bachelors from Yale University, and a Juris Doctor degree from NYU School of Law, after which she spent more than a decade working as a civil rights and capital defense attorney at the NAACP Legal Defense and Educational Fund, Inc., and the Office of the Federal Public Defender. Hoag-Fordjour was the inaugural practitioner-in-residence at the Eric H. Holder Jr. Initiative for Civil & Political Rights at Columbia University and a lecturer at Columbia Law School. She served as a law clerk to the late Honorable John T. Nixon of the United States District Court for the Middle District of Tennessee.

Hoag-Fordjour was elected a member of the American Law Institute in 2021.

References 

Brooklyn Law School faculty
21st-century American women lawyers
21st-century American lawyers
African-American legal scholars
1982 births
Living people
Members of the American Law Institute
American people of Tanzanian descent
American women legal scholars
American legal scholars
21st-century African-American academics
21st-century American academics
California lawyers
Yale University alumni
New York University School of Law alumni